Esporte Clube Quirinópolis is a football club in the city of Quirinópolis, in the state of Goiás wed already disputed the third division of Campeonato Goiano.

History
Founded on March 18, 1986 in the city of Quirinópolis in the state of Goiás, the club is affiliated to Federação Goiana de Futebol 
and the last professional championship disputed by the club was in 2014, when it disputed the Campeonato Goiano (Third Division).

Titles
 Campeonato Goiano (Second Division) (1988)

References 

Association football clubs established in 1986
Football clubs in Goiás